Danwolsan (단월산 / 丹月山) is a mountain of South Korea. It has an elevation of 778 metres

See also
List of mountains of Korea

References

Mountains of South Korea